Driftglass is a 1971 collection of science fiction short stories by American writer Samuel R. Delany. The stories originally appeared in the magazines Worlds of Tomorrow, The Magazine of Fantasy & Science Fiction, If and New Worlds or the anthologies Quark/3, Dangerous Visions and Alchemy & Academe. In 2019, Driftglass was selected as one of the "50 Unapologetically Queer Authors Share the Best LGBTQ Books of All Time" in O, The Oprah Magazine.

Contents
 "The Star Pit"
 "Dog in a Fisherman’s Net"
 "Corona"
 "Aye, and Gomorrah..." (winner of the Nebula Award)
 "Driftglass"
 "We, in Some Strange Power’s Employ, Move on a Rigorous Line"
 "Cage of Brass"
 "High Weir"
 "Time Considered as a Helix of Semi-Precious Stones" (winner of the Hugo Award and Nebula Award)
 "Night and the Loves of Joe Dicostanzo"

References

Sources

1971 short story collections
Fantasy short story collections
Science fiction short story collections
Short story collections by Samuel Delany
Underwater civilizations in fiction
Underwater novels